"We All Go Back to Where We Belong" is the final single from American alternative rock band R.E.M., released in 2011. The song is the lead single from the band's final album, the career-spanning greatest hits compilation Part Lies, Part Heart, Part Truth, Part Garbage 1982–2011. The song was made available over the Internet on October 17, 2011.

Recording

The song was originally written by bassist Mike Mills and was recorded by the band in Athens, Georgia in July 2011, after the sessions for its final studio release, Collapse into Now. The band finished this song as well as the demos "A Month of Saturdays" and "Hallelujah" with producer Jacknife Lee initially with the intention of creating an album independently, after having fulfilled its contractual obligations to Warner Bros. Records, but decided to disband instead.

Two music videos with direction by Dominic J. DeJoseph and Michael Stipe—one starring Kirsten Dunst and the other with John Giorno. Stipe conceived of the concept for the videos spontaneously while recording his vocal track and asked DeJoseph to make the videos in the style of Andy Warhol's Screen Tests. Stipe personally asked Dunst—his neighbor in New York City—to star in the video and did three takes with Dunst; the one that was chosen had him singing the song to her off-camera.

Reception

Critical reception
Early reviews of the song considered it a "low-key, string-drenched ballad" (Stereogum) and compared it to the pop styling of Burt Bacharach and R.E.M.'s 2001 album Reveal. Jon Dolan of Rolling Stone gave the song 3.5 out of five stars, writing that the "orchestral folk rock... suits their breakup perfectly." Exclaim! Alex Hudson had a similar sentiment, declaring the single "a nice kiss-off with lyrics that read a bit like a pensive goodbye message." Claire Suddath of Time also considers it a fitting final single, comparing it with the wistfulness of "Man on the Moon" and The Boston Heralds Jed Gottlieb has compared it favorably to R.E.M. ballads "Nightswimming" and "Perfect Circle".

Chart performance

Personnel
R.E.M.
Peter Buck – guitar, writing, and production
Mike Mills – bass guitar, background vocals, writing, and production
Michael Stipe – vocals, writing, and production

Technical personnel
Chris Bilheimer – art design
Jacknife Lee – production

References

2011 songs
2011 singles
Folk rock songs
Rock ballads
Song recordings produced by Jacknife Lee
Song recordings produced by Michael Stipe
Song recordings produced by Mike Mills
Song recordings produced by Peter Buck
Songs written by Michael Stipe
Songs written by Mike Mills
Songs written by Peter Buck
R.E.M. songs
Warner Records singles
Black-and-white music videos